XHLX-FM is a radio station on 95.1 FM in Zitácuaro, Michoacán, Mexico. It is owned by Radio Zitácuaro, S.A. and known as La Grande de Michoacán.

History
XELX-AM received its concession on March 28, 1956. It broadcast with 10 kW on 1460 kHz.

In the 1990s, XELX moved to 700 kHz and cut its nighttime power to 500 watts. It was approved to migrate to FM in 2011.

Until early 2016, it broadcast the grupera format programmed by Grupo Siete Comunicación (known as La Jefa and later La Única).

External links
XHLX Facebook Page

References

Radio stations in Michoacán
Radio stations in Mexico with continuity obligations